The 1995-96 Primera Divisió was the inaugural season of Primera Divisió, the highest football league in Andorra. FC Encamp became the champion, finishing two points ahead of CE Principat. Construccions Emprim withdrew from the league after the season. No teams were relegated, as the Segona Divisió was introduced in 1999.

League table

References
Andorra - List of final tables (RSSSF)

Primera Divisió seasons
Andorra
1995–96 in Andorran football